Chordifex abortivus, commonly known as Manypeaks rush,  is a species of rush in the genus Chordifex.

The culm sheaths are flared with no lamina present, they have numerous branches, with each branch divided again into branchlets and terminating in spikelets. It has separate male and female plants.

It grows among heath or scrub with a sedge understorey in loamy, sandy or gravelly soils. Species associated C. abortivus with include Hakea cucullata, Banksia brownii, Banksia baxteri, Banksia coccinea, Melaleuca striata, Pericalymma ellipticum and Dasypogon bromeliifolius.

It is a declared rare flora, but recorded a significant range extension when surveys were conducted in 2000.

References

Restionaceae
Endemic flora of Australia
Taxa named by Christian Gottfried Daniel Nees von Esenbeck